The Brooklyn Bridge is a concrete girder bridge that carries the Pacific Motorway (M1) across the Hawkesbury River between  to Mooney Mooney Point, located  north of Sydney in New South Wales, Australia. The bridge comprises a dual carriageway with three lanes in each direction of motorway grade-separated conditions.

The adjacent Peats Ferry Bridge carries the Pacific Highway (B83) across the Hawkesbury River in a single carriageway with one lane in each direction in state highway conditions. The Peats Ferry Bridge permits the carriage of pedestrian and bicycles; not permitted on the Brooklyn Bridge. Both bridges are maintained by Transport for NSW.

History
This bridge was built to connect the sections of the Sydney-Newcastle Freeway immediately north and south of the Hawkesbury River. Between 1968 and 1973 freeway traffic was required to rejoin the Pacific Highway in either direction and use the Peats Ferry Bridge (opened in 1945) to cross the river.

It was opened in two stages. The three northbound lanes were opened to traffic in August 1973, and the resulting changes to traffic arrangements (whereby northbound traffic no longer had to join the Pacific Highway to use the adjoining Peats Ferry Bridge to cross the Hawkesbury then diverge to where the freeway recommenced north of the river) allowed the approaches at either end of the three southbound lanes to be completed in October 1973, to bring the full width of the bridge into use.

Description

References

External links 
  from  - informational video of construction

Hawkesbury River
Girder bridges
Bridges completed in 1973
1973 establishments in Australia
Concrete bridges in Australia
Road bridges in New South Wales